The Aircraft Operations Center (AOC) is the main base for the approximately nine aircraft of the National Oceanic and Atmospheric Administration of the United States government.

It is the home of the NOAA Hurricane Hunters.  The NOAA Aircraft Operations Center houses multiple light aircraft, and three Hurricane Hunters aircraft.  This base plays a large role every hurricane season, supporting NOAA flights in and around tropical cyclones for research and forecasting.

The Aircraft Operations Center, located at Lakeland Linder International Airport in Lakeland, Florida, since June 2017, is under the Office of Marine and Aviation Operations (OMAO), a branch of the National Oceanic and Atmospheric Administration (NOAA). NOAA is part of the Department of Commerce. The AOC resided at MacDill Air Force Base in Tampa, Florida, from January 1993 to June 2017.

Aircraft
 Two WP-3D Orion - heavily instrumented turboprops used for hurricane hunting
 One Gulfstream IV-SP (G-IV) - twin turbofan jet aircraft for high-altitude hurricane research
 Four DeHavilland Twin Otter (DHC-6) 
 One Beechcraft King Air
 One Rockwell Jetprop

See also
 NOAA ships and aircraft

References

External links
 Aircraft Operations Center

National Oceanic and Atmospheric Administration
Lakeland, Florida